Selenarctia is a genus of moths in the family Erebidae.

Species
 Selenarctia elissa Schaus, 1892
 Selenarctia elissoides Rothschild, 1909
 Selenarctia flavidorsata Watson, 1975
 Selenarctia pseudelissa Dognin, 1902
 Selenarctia schausi Rothschild, 1916

References

Natural History Museum Lepidoptera generic names catalog

Phaegopterina
Moth genera